Abdoul Aziz Ibrahim (born 15 March 1996) is a Nigerien professional footballer who plays as a winger for Nigelec.

References

1996 births
Living people
Nigerien footballers
Niger international footballers
AS GNN players
ASN Nigelec players
Association football wingers
Niger A' international footballers
2020 African Nations Championship players
2022 African Nations Championship players